Doutor Maurício Cardoso is a municipality in the state of Rio Grande do Sul, Brazil.  As of 2020, the estimated population was 4,462.

The municipality would be partially flooded by the proposed Panambi Dam.

See also
List of municipalities in Rio Grande do Sul

References

Municipalities in Rio Grande do Sul